Bugok is a dong, or precinct, in Geumjeong-gu, Busan, South Korea.

See also
Geography of South Korea
Administrative divisions of South Korea

References

Geumjeong District
Neighbourhoods in Busan